Crawley is an unincorporated community in Greenbrier County, West Virginia, United States, on U.S. Route 60, southeast of Rupert. Its ZIP code is 24931.

References

Unincorporated communities in Greenbrier County, West Virginia
Unincorporated communities in West Virginia